William Daly (born 3 September 1877) was an Irish hurler who played as a forward for the Cork senior team.

Daly made his first appearance for the team during the 1902 championship and was a regular member of the starting fifteen for that season. He made a brief return to the team for the 1909 championship. During that time he won a set of All-Ireland and Munster winners' medals.

At club level Daly was a three-time county championship medalist with Dungourney.

References

1877 births
Dungourney hurlers
Cork inter-county hurlers
All-Ireland Senior Hurling Championship winners
Year of death missing